Anosiarivo is a rural municipality located in the Atsinanana region of eastern Madagascar.  It belongs to the Marolambo District.

The commune is situated in a remote area of Madagascar. It is still covered at 44% with native forests.

6 fokontany (villages) belong to the municipality: Anosiarivo I, Ambalapaiso, Ambalasavoka, Beanana, Befotaka and Maintimbato. 44% of the municipalitiy is covered with forests.

References

Populated places in Atsinanana